Jean Carlos Mejía (born August 26, 1996) is a Dominican professional baseball pitcher in the Milwaukee Brewers organization. He has previously played in MLB for the Cleveland Indians.

Career

Cleveland Indians
Mejía signed with the Cleveland Indians as an international free agent in 2013. He made his professional debut in 2014 with the Dominican Summer League Indians, going 3–0 with a 2.70 ERA in  innings. He returned to the Dominican Summer League in both 2015 and 2016, pitching to a 4–3 record and 1.37 ERA in  relief innings in 2015, and going 2–4 with a 3.48 ERA in  innings in 2016. In 2017, he pitched for both the Arizona League Indians and the Mahoning Valley Scrappers where he compiled a 2–0 record with a 1.22 ERA in 21 relief appearances, and in 2018, he played for the Lake County Captains and the Lynchburg Hillcats, going 4–9 with a 3.31 ERA in 18 games (16 starts).

The Indians added him to their 40-man roster after the 2018 season. Mejía returned to Lynchburg to begin 2019. In 2019, he pitched to a 3-1 record and 4.09 ERA with 36 strikeouts in 33.0 innings of work. Mejía did not play in a game in 2020 due to the cancellation of the minor league season because of the COVID-19 pandemic.

Mejía began the 2021 season with the Triple-A Columbus Clippers. On May 18, 2021, Mejía was promoted to the major leagues for the first time. He made his major league debut on May 21, 2021, against the Minnesota Twins, striking out 5 batters in  innings of relief.
Mejía made 17 appearances in 2021, posting an 8.25 ERA and 47 strikeouts.
Mejía was designated for assignment by the newly-named Cleveland Guardians on November 19, 2021.

Milwaukee Brewers
On November 22, 2021, Mejía was traded to the Milwaukee Brewers in exchange for a player to be named later (catcher David Fry) or cash considerations.

On May 17, 2022, Mejía was suspended by Major League Baseball for 80 games after testing positive for stanozolol.

On August 24, 2022, Mejía was sent outright to Triple-A Nashville.

See also
List of Major League Baseball players suspended for performance-enhancing drugs

References

External links

1996 births
Living people
Arizona League Indians players
Cleveland Indians players
Columbus Clippers players
Dominican Republic expatriate baseball players in the United States
Dominican Republic sportspeople in doping cases
Dominican Summer League Indians players
Lake County Captains players
Lynchburg Hillcats players
Mahoning Valley Scrappers players
Major League Baseball pitchers
Major League Baseball players from the Dominican Republic
Milwaukee Brewers players
People from Espaillat Province
Tigres del Licey players